The Honourable George Knox PC, FRS (14 January 1765 – 13 June 1827), was an Irish Tory politician.

Knox was the fifth son of Thomas Knox, 1st Viscount Northland. In 1790, Knox entered the Irish House of Commons for Dungannon. Subsequently, he sat for Dublin University until the Act of Union in 1801. Thereafter Knox sat as a Member of Parliament (MP) in the United Kingdom Parliament and represented Dublin University from 1801 to 1807. He was also elected for Dungannon in 1801 and 1806, but chose to represent Dublin University both times.

Notes

References

1765 births
1827 deaths
Irish Conservative Party MPs
Irish MPs 1790–1797
Irish MPs 1798–1800
Members of the Parliament of the United Kingdom for County Tyrone constituencies (1801–1922)
Members of the Parliament of the United Kingdom for Dublin University
Tory MPs (pre-1834)
UK MPs 1801–1802
UK MPs 1802–1806
UK MPs 1806–1807
Younger sons of viscounts
Fellows of the Royal Society
Members of the Privy Council of Ireland
Commissioners of the Treasury for Ireland
Members of the Parliament of Ireland (pre-1801) for County Tyrone constituencies
Members of the Parliament of Ireland (pre-1801) for Dublin University